HISTORY 1  is the first compilation album by Japanese pop-rock band Chicago Poodle. It was released on 30 November, 2011 by Giza Studio label.

Background
The album consists of indies and major label songs which has been released over past seven years since their debut. 

Their fifth single Sakurairo was exclusively released in this compilation album. Taiyo wa Shitteru is a completely new songs which hasn't been published anywhere else.

This is their first and the only album so far which has been released in two formats: regular CD edition and limited CD+DVD edition. DVD disc contains footage of their live performances and several music videoclips.

A special website was launched to promote the album with the preview track list and message by band themselves.

Charting
The album reached the #58 rank in Oricon for its first week and sold 1,798 copies. It charted for two weeks and sold 2,219 copies in total.

Track listing
All the tracks has been arranged by Chicago Poodle.

Disc 1

Disc 2

Personnel
Credits adapted from the CD booklet of History 1.

Kouta Hanazawa - composing, vocals, keyboard, piano
Kenji Tsujimoto - bass, songwriting
Norihito Yamaguchi - drums, songwriting
Hidenori Sugioka - songwriting, guitars
Yoshinobu Ohga (ex. OOM) - guitars
Satoshi Iwakura - arranging, guitars
Koga Kazunori - guitars
Shunsuke Nakada - guitars
Keisuke Kurumatani (ex. U-ka Saegusa in dB) - percussion
Satoru Kobayashi - arranging, synthesizer
Kakou Kanako (Harmony Fields) - accordion
Ritchie Carvalley - percussion
Masaomi Yokoo - saxophone
Naoki Okajima - saxophone

Makoto Higashi - trumpet
Yoshinori Akai - mixed engineering
Maki Nanase - mixed engineering
Tatsuya Okada - mixed engineering
Sachi Miura - mixed engineering
Yukio Yamamoto - recording engineer
Katsuhiro Shimada - mastering
Gan kojima - art director
Minoru - illustrator
Nagisa Yamaguchi - photography
Keita Iwao - A&R
Kanonji - executive producer
Hideaki Magate - label management
Kazuhiro Mochida - director

In media
Sakurairo was used as ending theme for Asahi Broadcasting Corporation program Kazoku Lesson
ending theme for TV Kanazawa program "Tonari no TV Kinchan"
Is this LOVE? was used as ending theme for Nihon TV program Himitsu no Kenmin Show
Fly ~Kaze ga Fukinuketeiku~ was used as theme song for Asahi Broadcasting Corporation program Kazoku Lesson
Hallelujah was used as ending theme for March of TV Kanazawa program "Tonari no TV Kinchan"
Tabi Bito was used as ending theme for TV Tokyo program "Golf no Shizui"
Oddysey was used as ending theme for TV Tokyo program "JAPAN COUNTDOWN"
Natsu Mellon was used as ending theme for July of Sanyo Broadcasting program "Yutanpo"
Sayonara Baby was used as ending theme for September of TV Kanazawa program "Tonari no TV Kinchan"
Hello was used as ending theme for FM Kagoshima radio broadcast program W-ing Up

References 

Giza Studio albums
Being Inc. compilation albums
Japanese-language compilation albums
2011 compilation albums
Chicago Poodle albums